The Book of Daniel is a book of the Hebrew Bible.

Book of Daniel can also refer to:
The Book of Daniel (album), a 2018 album by American recording artist Danny!
The Book of Daniel (film), a 2013 straight-to-DVD production
The Book of Daniel (novel), a 1971 novel by E. L. Doctorow, loosely based on the case of Julius and Ethel Rosenberg
The Book of Daniel (TV series), a 2006 series on NBC